Devon Soltendieck is a Canadian television entertainment reporter. He has been a MuchMusic VJ, and from early 2010 until January 2013 an anchor and reporter on CP24.

Early life

Soltendieck attended a summer school for two months in Villars, Switzerland. He returned to Canada to finish high school and graduated from Selwyn House School in Westmount, Quebec, then from Dawson College CEGEP. While a student at Dawson, Soltendieck helped run the school newspaper. Before he was hired by MuchMusic, Soltendieck was a student of Economics and Political Science at Concordia University and continued his education in Finance at the University of Toronto thereafter. Soltendieck is a professionally trained violinist and horn player and has taught himself to play guitar and percussion. He is fluently bilingual in English and French.

Career

MuchMusic

Soltendieck's career began in 2004, when he won MuchMusic's VJ Search competition at the age of 18. He was first awarded a three-month contract and went on to work for the station for six years. As a VJ, Soltendieck was part of the MuchNews team, interviewing numerous celebrities and covering current events. Soltendieck also briefly appeared in the movie Fantastic Four, as a MuchMusic reporter. He was voted one of TV Guide'''s "Top 10 Stars on the Verge of a Major Breakout" in March 2005.

CP24

Soltendieck joined the news team at CP24 in 2010 as an anchor and remote host. He ended his run in 2013.

Etalk
Soltendieck joined Etalk on August 21, 2013 until November 22, 2018.

Pop Quiz on E!
Starting November 2013, Soltendieck hosted a short-lived game show Pop Quiz'' on the E! Canada entertainment network.

References

External links
Devon Soltendieck page on MuchMusic Official website

Devon Soltendieck Facebook page
Devon Soltendieck Twitter page

Living people
Journalists from Montreal
Much (TV channel) personalities
Anglophone Quebec people
Canadian game show hosts
Dawson College alumni
People from Dorval
Canadian VJs (media personalities)
1985 births